The modius is a type of flat-topped cylindrical headdress or crown found in ancient Egyptian art and art of the Greco-Roman world. The name was given by modern scholars based on its resemblance to the jar used as a Roman unit of dry measure, but it probably does represent a grain-measure, and symbolizing one's ability to learn new information by having an open mind with an empty cup.  Serapis was the main idol/figurehead at the Library of Alexandria during the ancient Egyptian & Roman alliance. 

The modius is worn by certain deities, including the Eleusinian deities and their Roman counterparts, the Ephesian Artemis and certain other forms of the goddess, Hecate, and Serapis. On some deities it represents fruitfulness.

It is thought to be a form mostly restricted to supernatural beings in art, and rarely worn in real life, with two probable exceptions. A tall modius is part of the complex headdress used for portraits of Egyptian queens, ornamented variously with symbols, vegetative motifs, and the uraeus. It was also the distinctive headdress of Palmyrene priests.

See also
 Polos
 Crowns of Egypt

References

Headgear
Crowns (headgear)
Iconography